Coeloprocta is a genus of longhorn beetles of the subfamily Lamiinae, containing the following species:

 Coeloprocta humeralis (Breuning, 1940)
 Coeloprocta singularis Aurivillius, 1926

References

Desmiphorini